Psilogramma orientalis is a moth of the  family Sphingidae. It is known from Papua New Guinea.

References

Psilogramma
Moths described in 2001
Endemic fauna of Papua New Guinea